Annette Robertson (born 1940) is an English film and television actress. She appeared in several films in her early twenties, including A Kind of Loving (1962), Spare the Rod and The Young Ones (both 1961), appearing with Cliff Richard in the latter. She played Fran in the British film The Party's Over (1965).

From 1962 up to the mid 1980s, Robertson worked regularly in television, appearing in series such as Coronation Street, No Hiding Place and Doctor Who. She last appeared onscreen in 1988, in an episode of Boon.

From 1962 to 1964, she was married to actor John Hurt.

Filmography

References

External links
 Annette Robertson at the BFI
 

Date of birth missing (living people)
1940 births
Living people
20th-century English actresses
English television actresses
English film actresses
People from Ilford